WZCT (1330 AM, "Southern Gospel Z-13") was a radio station licensed to serve Scottsboro, Alabama. The station was last owned by Bonner and Carlile Enterprises. It aired a Southern Gospel music format.

The station was assigned the WZCT call letters by the Federal Communications Commission (FCC) on March 5, 1990. The station's owners surrendered its license on February 16, 2021, and it was cancelled on March 1, 2021.

References

External links
FCC Station Search Details: DWZCT (Facility ID: 6357)
FCC History Cards for WZCT (covering 1950-1981 as WROS / WKEA)

ZCT
Radio stations established in 1990
Radio stations disestablished in 2021
Defunct radio stations in the United States
Defunct religious radio stations in the United States
ZCT
1990 establishments in Alabama
2021 disestablishments in Alabama